The 2005-06 Memphis Grizzlies season was the team's 11th in the NBA. They began the season hoping to improve upon their 45-37 output from the previous season. They bested it by four games, finishing 49-33, and qualified for the playoffs for the third straight season.

Draft picks

Roster

Regular season

Season standings

Record vs. opponents

Game log

Playoffs

|- align="center" bgcolor="#ffcccc"
| 1
| April 23
| @ Dallas
| L 93–103
| Pau Gasol (24)
| Jake Tsakalidis (8)
| Gasol, Jackson (4)
| American Airlines Center20,340
| 0–1
|- align="center" bgcolor="#ffcccc"
| 2
| April 26
| @ Dallas
| L 79–94
| Pau Gasol (16)
| Pau Gasol (7)
| Pau Gasol (5)
| American Airlines Center20,612
| 0–2
|- align="center" bgcolor="#ffcccc"
| 3
| April 29
| Dallas
| L 89–94 (OT)
| Chucky Atkins (20)
| Lorenzen Wright (10)
| Eddie Jones (5)
| FedExForum17,871
| 0–3
|- align="center" bgcolor="#ffcccc"
| 4
| May 1
| Dallas
| L 76–102
| Pau Gasol (25)
| Shane Battier (7)
| Chucky Atkins (4)
| FedExForum15,104
| 0–4
|-

Player statistics

Season

Playoffs

Awards and records
Mike Miller, NBA Sixth Man of the Year Award
Pau Gasol, NBA All-Star Game

Transactions

References

Memphis Grizzlies seasons
Memphis
Memphis Grizzlies
Memphis Grizzlies
Events in Memphis, Tennessee